is a Japanese politician of the Liberal Democratic Party (LDP), a member of the House of Representatives in the Diet (national legislature). A native of Nagasu, Kumamoto and graduate of Tokyo University of Agriculture and Technology he joined the Ministry of Construction in 1967. Leaving the ministry, he was elected to the House of Representatives for the first time in 1996.  He represented the 2nd District of Kumamoto prefecture.

References 

 

1959 births
Living people
Tokyo University of Agriculture and Technology alumni
People from Kumamoto Prefecture
Members of the House of Representatives (Japan)
Liberal Democratic Party (Japan) politicians
21st-century Japanese politicians